Stefanie Böhler (born 27 February 1981) is a German former cross-country skier who competed between 1999 and 2018. She won a silver medal in the 4 × 5 km relay at the 2006 Winter Olympics in Turin. Her best individual finish was 20th in both the individual sprint and the 30 km events at those same games.

Böhler also won a silver medal in the 4 × 5 km relay at the 2007 FIS Nordic World Ski Championships. Her best individual result at the FIS Nordic World Ski Championships was sixth in the 30 km classical mass start event at Falun in 2015. She won the German national championship in the sprint in 2004 and the 5 km in 2006, and also won a 2002 Continental Cup event in Italy. She won a World Cup team  sprint with Denise Herrmann in 2010.

With 343 individual World Cup starts, Böhler ranks second all-time, for both men and women, after Aino-Kaisa Saarinen with 354.

She announced her retirement from cross-country skiing in March 2019, together with teammates Elisabeth Schicho and Sandra Ringwald.

Cross-country skiing results
All results are sourced from the International Ski Federation (FIS).

Olympic Games
 2 medals – (1 silver, 1 bronze)

World Championships
 1 medal – (1 silver)

World Cup results

Season standings

Individual podiums
 2 podiums – (2 )

Team podiums
 4 victories – (2 , 2 ) 
 17 podiums – (11 , 6 )

References

External links

 
 
 
 
 

1981 births
Living people
People from Bad Säckingen
Sportspeople from Freiburg (region)
German female cross-country skiers
Cross-country skiers at the 2006 Winter Olympics
Cross-country skiers at the 2010 Winter Olympics
Cross-country skiers at the 2014 Winter Olympics
Cross-country skiers at the 2018 Winter Olympics
Olympic silver medalists for Germany
Olympic bronze medalists for Germany
Olympic cross-country skiers of Germany
Olympic medalists in cross-country skiing
FIS Nordic World Ski Championships medalists in cross-country skiing
Tour de Ski skiers
Medalists at the 2006 Winter Olympics
Medalists at the 2014 Winter Olympics